Events from the year 1827 in China.

Incumbents
 Daoguang Emperor (7th year)

Events
 local officials in Guangzhou suggested the government fund the building of seven fast patrol boats designed along the same model as the fast crabs

References 

 
China